Spotsylvania High School is a public high school in Spotsylvania County, Virginia. It serves the southern half of the county. The Knights are the least densely populated of the schools in the division. SHS houses the only International Baccalaureate programme in the division, as well as being one of two sites for the Commonwealth Governor's School, both of these centers are made up of students accepted into the program who come from SHS as well as other high schools in Spotsylvania County,  SHS also works in partnership with Germanna Community College to offer the Gladys P. Todd academy where students attend GCC during the day for their junior and senior years - achieving an Associates Degree along with their high school diploma upon graduation.   The Original Spotsylvania High School opened in 1940 and three schools hosted the name of Spotsylvania High School.

As of the 2017-2018 school year, the school had an enrollment of 1,152 students and 80.1 classroom teachers (on an FTE basis), for a student–teacher ratio of 14.1:1. There were 371 students (33.0% of enrollment) eligible for free lunch and 92 (8.2% of students) eligible for reduced-cost lunch.

About the building
Spotsylvania High was the county’s first consolidated high school for students who had previously attended much smaller schools in tiny rural communities including Marye and Margo. Spotsylvania High, on Courthouse Road, was considered state of the art when it opened; when numbers of students grew, the next Spotsylvania High School was built across the street in 1967. Black students from segregated John J. Wright High School began attending Spotsylvania High when schools became fully integrated in 1968. The third Spotsylvania High opened in 1994.

Construction started on the school in May, 1992 and occupied in January, 1994. The cost of the project was reported to be $23.7 million. Total capacity is 1583 students in 79 classrooms. The auditorium can seat 1300, the gymnasium seats 2000, and the stadium seats 4000 people. Massaponax High School, built in 1998, was constructed from the same blueprint as Spotsylvania High School.

Administration
, Mr. Kelly Guempel is the principal of Spotsylvania High School. Assistant principals include Mr. Robert Marchetti, Mrs. Veronica Jackson, and Mr. Reitha Abed. Other administration staff include Ms. Michelle Hart, Instructional Coordinator, Mr. William Swink, Activities Director, and Ms. Rachel Bentley-Goode, School Counseling Director.

Following the 2015-2016 school year, Principal Rusty Davis and Athletic Director Buddy Herndon were reassigned to different positions in the school system for unknown reasons.

Advanced Placement Program and International Baccalaureate Programme 
The Advanced Placement (AP) Program gives students the opportunity to pursue
college-level studies while still at Spotsylvania County. Upon completion of the courses, students
may receive advanced placement and/or credit when entering college. Academically oriented
students are strongly encouraged to participate in the Advanced Placement Program. Students take these courses at high school. Advanced Placement (AP) courses follow the suggested College Board course curriculum and serve to prepare students for the AP examinations in May. AP Courses listed below are offered based on enrollment. However, depending on how many students sign up for  an AP class, depends on which course is offered. So some of the courses may not be offered because there are not enough students that sign up for it. Grades earned carry weighted credit in the GPA calculation.
The International Baccalaureate (IB) Programme's Diploma Program was recently added to SHS in 2016, with the Class of 2018 seeing its first graduates. , the coordinator for the program is Ms. Catherine LaRocco. The International Baccalaureate® (IB) offers a continuum of international education. The programmes encourage both personal and academic achievement, challenging students to excel in their studies and in their personal development. The programme aims to develop students who have excellent breadth and depth of knowledge – students who flourish physically, intellectually, emotionally and ethically.

Athletics  

In 2021, Moses Wilson secured his 100th victory on the last individual state finals match for the 126 lbs Virginia State championship match. Where he secured a major decision against his opponent.   This making Moses the 1st individual wrestling state championship in Spotsylvania history in 30 years.

Spotsylvania High school has won 4 State championships since their existence. The most recent State Championship is the 13-8 win in extra innings against Abingdon High school on June, 9th, 2018.

Football: 1991, 1994, 1997

Baseball: 2018

Track and Field:
-Indoor High Jump State Champion 2018- Limiah Coleman
-Indoor High Jump State Champion 2019- Limiah Coleman

Junior Reserve Officers' Training Corps 
Spotsylvania High School is home to the US Army JROTC "Knight Battalion." The battalion is composed of about 150 cadets from both Massaponax and Spotsylvania High School. , the Battalion is led by Senior Army Instructor COL(Retired) Bryant, Army Instructor 1SG (Retired) McBean, and the Cadet Leadership. The Knight Battalion often partakes in local events including the Spotsylvania County Christmas Parade and other community events. The Battalion has many different teams to offer, including the Raider Team, Drill Team, and Color Guard.

Band, choir, and orchestra
Spotsylvania High School is known for its strong fine arts department.  In 2018, the school re-established itself as a Blue Ribbon School of Music, led by Mr. Brian Jacobs and Ms. Joanna Peters.

Notable faculty
 Bobby Orrock (born 1955), agriculture instructor who has been a member of the Virginia House of Delegates.

Sexual harassment 
On October 23, 2015, two Spotsylvania High School students were sexually assaulted in the locker room by other members of the football team prior to a football game.

References

Public high schools in Virginia
Spotsylvania County Public Schools
Public middle schools in Virginia
Public elementary schools in Virginia
1967 establishments in Virginia